Pascal Nyabenda (born 12 April 1966) is a Burundian politician, who serves as President of the National Assembly of Burundi since 2015. He has been president of the ruling National Council for the Defense of Democracy – Forces for the Defense of Democracy since March 2012 (as well as heading the party's parliamentary group prior) and previously served as Governor of Bubanza Province.

Biography
Pascal Nyabenda was born in Mpanda in Bubanza Province, Burundi on 12 April 1966. He worked as a teacher but fled into exile in 1995 during the Burundian Civil War. He lived as a refugee in the Democratic Republic of the Congo, Kenya and Tanzania, and became a representative of the rebel National Council for the Defense of Democracy – Forces for the Defense of Democracy (Conseil national pour la Défense de la DémocratieForces pour la Défense de la Démocratie, CNDD–FDD). He returned to Burundi under the regime of President Pierre Nkurunziza and held various offices. He served as Governor of Bubanza Province from March 2006.

Nyabenda was elected to the National Assembly in the June 2015 parliamentary election as a CNDD–FDD candidate, and he was elected by the deputies as President of the National Assembly on 30 July 2015. There was no other candidate for the post, and Nyabenda received 101 votes.

References

1966 births
Living people
National Council for the Defense of Democracy – Forces for the Defense of Democracy politicians
Presidents of the National Assembly (Burundi)
People from Bubanza Province
21st-century Burundian people